The Trials for Felony Act 1836 (6 & 7 Will 4 c 114) was an Act of the Parliament of the United Kingdom.

This Act was extended to the Turks and Caicos Islands by the Act 4 Vic c 30.

This Act was repealed in part by the Summary Jurisdiction Act 1848.

The words "and be it further enacted, that" wherever they occurred were repealed by section 1 of, and the Schedule to, the Statute Law Revision (No. 2) Act 1888 (51 & 52 Vict c 57).

In a report dated 27 September 1985, the Law Commission and the Scottish Law Commission said that section 4 was the only provision that had not been repealed. They said that it was redundant. They recommended that the Act be repealed. This Act was repealed by section 1(1) of, and Group 1 of Part I of Schedule 1 to, the Statute Law (Repeals) Act 1986.

This Act was repealed for Northern Ireland by section 15(2) of, and Schedule 2 to, the Criminal Law Act (Northern Ireland) 1967.

This Act was repealed for the Republic of Ireland by section 16 of, and the Third Schedule to, the Criminal Law Act 1997.

Preamble
The preamble was repealed by section 1 of, and Part II of the Schedule to, the Statute Law Revision (No. 2) Act 1890 (53 & 54 Vict c 51).

Section 1 - All persons tried for felony after 1 October next may make their defence by counsel or attorney
This section was repealed for England and Wales by section 10(2) of, and Part III of Schedule 3 to, the Criminal Law Act 1967.

This section, to "October next" was repealed by section 1 of, and Part II of the Schedule to, the Statute Law Revision (No. 2) Act 1890.

Section 5
This section from "this Act" to "Parliament; and that" was repealed by section 1 of, and the Schedule to, the Statute Law Revision Act 1874 (37 & 38 Vict c 35).

References
The Statutes of the United Kingdom of Great Britain and Ireland, 6 & 7 Will IV. 1836. King's Printer. 1836. Pages 653 and 654.
Hansard
Richard Matthews. "Prisoners' Counsel Bill". The Criminal Law as altered by various Statutes of Will. IV. and 1 Victoria. Alphabetically Arranged. Comprising the New Statutes, New Forms of Indictment, the Evidence necessary to support them, the Punishment in each Case, and an Index. Saunders and Benning. Fleet Street, London. 1837. Pages 166 to 168 and 216 and 217. See also pages 84, 224 and 229.
"Preliminary Note". Halsbury's Statutes of England and Wales. Fourth Edition. LexisNexis. 2008 Reissue. Volume 12(1).
"The Trials for Felony Act 1836". Halsbury's Statutes of England. Third Edition. Butterworths. London. 1969. Volume 8. Page 85 and preliminary note.
"The Trials for Felony Act, 1836". Halsbury's Statutes of England. First Edition. Butterworth & Co (Publishers) Ltd. Bell Yard, Temple Bar, London. 1929. Volume 4:  . Page 459. See also Preliminary Note at page 255. See also pages 315 and 715.
William Hanbury Aggs. "The Trials for Felony Act 1836". Chitty's Statutes of Practical Utility. Sixth Edition. Sweet and Maxwell. Stevens and Sons. Chancery Lane, London. 1912. Volume 3. Title "Criminal Law". Page 212 et seq.
John Mounteney Lely. "Defence by Counsel. 1836.". The Statutes of Practical Utility. (Chitty's Statutes). Fifth Edition. Sweet and Maxwell. Stevens and Sons. London. 1894. Volume 3. Title "Criminal Law". Pages 32 and 33.
John Mounteney Lely. Chitty's Collection of Statutes of Practical Utility. Fourth Edition. Henry Sweet. Stevens and Sons. Chancery Lane, London. 1880. Volume 2. Title "Criminal Law". Pages 218 and 219.
William Newland Welsby and Edward Beavan. Chitty's Collection of Statutes. Second Edition. S Sweet. London. Hodges and Smith. Dublin. 1851. Volume 2. Title "Criminal Law". Subtitle "Pleading and Procedure". Page 27.
The Statutes: Third Revised Edition. HMSO. London. 1950. Volume 4. Page 89.
The Statutes: Second Revised Edition. Printed under the authority of HMSO. London. 1894. Volume 5. Page 953:  .
The Statutes: Revised Edition. London. 1875. Volume 7. Pages 1177 to 1178.
"Abstract of Public General Statutes" (1836) 16 The Law Magazine 484
"Counsel to Prisoners" in "Abstracts of Important Public Acts". The Companion to the Almanac; or Year-Book of General Information for 1837. (The British Almanac). Charles Knight. Ludgate Street, London. 1837. Page 147.
Andrew Vance. The Green Book; or, Reading made easy of the Irish Statutes. Joseph White. Church Lane, College Green, Dublin. 1862. Page 289
John Tidd Pratt. A Collection of the Public General Statutes passed in the last Session (6 & 7 W. IV.) as far as relates to the Office of a Justice of the Peace and to parochial matters, in England and Wales, with Notes, References, and an Index. Shaw & Sons. Fetter Lane, London. 1836. Pages 205 and 206.

External links
List of repeals and amendments in the Republic of Ireland from the Irish Statute Book

United Kingdom Acts of Parliament 1836